The Call of Destiny is a 1922 German silent film directed by Johannes Guter and starring Xenia Desni, Fritz Kortner, and Ernst Hofmann.

Cast

References

Bibliography

External links

1922 films
Films of the Weimar Republic
Films directed by Johannes Guter
German silent feature films
German black-and-white films
UFA GmbH films